Helobdella stagnalis is a species of Helobdella.

The species was described in 1758 by Carolus Linnaeus as Hirudo stagnalis.

It has cosmopolitan distribution.

References

Leeches